Hohenlockstedt was an Amt ("collective municipality") in the district of Steinburg, in Schleswig-Holstein, Germany. The seat of the Amt was in Hohenlockstedt. In January 2008, it was disbanded, and its municipalities were divided over the Ämter Itzehoe-Land and Kellinghusen.

The Amt Hohenlockstedt consisted of the following municipalities:
Hohenlockstedt
Lockstedt 
Lohbarbek 
Schlotfeld 
Silzen 
Winseldorf

Former Ämter in Schleswig-Holstein